Michael English (born in Castledermot, County Kildare, Ireland on 23 April 1979) is an Irish country singer. He was born in a musical family as his father played button accordion with a traditional Irish band, his mother was an Irish dancer, and his two sisters played fiddle and piano.

At the age of nine, English started studying the piano formally at the Hennessy School of Music in Carlow. In 1990, he appeared on Gay Byrne's The Late Late Show television programme at age 11. He continued his musical studies the Royal Irish Academy of Music in Dublin and launched an Irish country music career. Henry McMahon of The Mainliners offered him one of his own compositions, "The Nearest to Perfect" that became a hit for English in 1999. Signing a contract with Ritz Records, English won Best International Entertainer at the Irish National Entertainers Awards ceremony in both 2004 and 2005. He went on to record a number of albums, and a number of single hits with Dolphin / Roscas Recordings.

Discography

Albums
Studio
2006: Best of Friends
2009: All My Life
2010: Portrait of My Love		
2012: This Is Michael English		
2015: Dance All Night

Singles
1999: "The Nearest to Perfect"
2016: "Tuam Beat"
2016: "Crazy Over You" (duet with Cliona Hagan)

References

External links
Official website

1979 births
Living people
People from County Kildare
Irish country singers
21st-century Irish  male singers